Great Hormead is a small village and former civil parish, now in the parish of Hormead in the East Hertfordshire district, in the county of Hertfordshire, England. It stands near the River Quin, on the B1038 road. The village of Little Hormead is nearby. In 1931 the parish had a population of 376.

History 
On 1 April 1937 the parish was abolished and merged with Little Hormead to form Hormead.

See also
 The Hundred Parishes

References

External links

  A Guide to Old Hertfordshire webpage for Great Hormead

Villages in Hertfordshire
Former civil parishes in Hertfordshire
East Hertfordshire District